The mountain mist frog or Nyakala frog (Ranoidea nyakalensis) was a species of frog in the subfamily Pelodryadinae, endemic to Australia. Its natural habitats were subtropical or tropical moist lowland forests and rivers. It was threatened by habitat loss and potentially chytrid fungus, before being declared extinct in 2022.

Taxonomy 
The mountain mist frog was one of the four species of Australian torrent treefrogs that comprise the Ranoidea nannotis species group. The other species are the common mist frog, waterfall frog, and armoured mist frog.

Conservation status
It was declared extinct in December 2022, a living specimen having not been seen since April 1990.

References

Ranoidea (genus)
Amphibians of Queensland
Nature Conservation Act endangered biota
Taxonomy articles created by Polbot
Amphibians described in 1974
Frogs of Australia
Taxobox binomials not recognized by IUCN